Vashon Island School District is a school district headquartered in Vashon Island, Washington.

Schools
Chautauqua Elementary School
McMurray Middle School
Vashon Island High School
Family Link

References

External links
 Vashon Island School District
Education in King County, Washington
School districts in Washington (state)